Varanasi Cantonment is a constituency of the Uttar Pradesh Legislative Assembly covering the city of Varanasi Cantonment in the Varanasi district of Uttar Pradesh, India.

Varanasi Cantonment is one of five assembly constituencies in the Varanasi Lok Sabha constituency. Since 2008, this assembly constituency is numbered 390 amongst 403 constituencies.

As of now, this seat belongs to Bharatiya Janta Party candidate Saurabh Srivastava who won in 2017 Uttar Pradesh Legislative Elections by defeating Indian National Congress candidate Anil Srivastava by a margin of 61,326 votes.

Members of Legislative Assembly

Election results

2022

2017

References

External links
 

Assembly constituencies of Uttar Pradesh
Varanasi
Politics of Varanasi district